Zacoalco de Torres, formerly Zacoalco ("place of closed water"), is a town and municipality in Jalisco, Mexico. The municipality covers an area of 491.27 km2. It is the primary production region of the equipal-style wood and pigskin furniture.

As of 2005, the municipality had a total population of 30,528.

To the east lies the largest lake in Mexico, La Playita.

Climate

Economy

Commerce

Current 
Equipales Imperial
Equipales de mi tierra
Equipales Los Díaz
Equipales Casillas
Equipales del Rey
Equipales el Nogal
Equipales Estrada
Equipales Magallanes
Equipales Toño Pila
Mi Bodega Aurrerá (Supermarket) (opened on July 16, 2013)
Coppel Canadá (Departament Store) (opened in September 2013)
BBVA (Bank and ATM)
Banorte (only ATM)
Banco Azteca (Bank and ATM)
Farmacias Guadalajara (Súper Pharmacy) (opened in autumn 2008)
Oxxo Zacoalco (Convenience Store) (opened on December 2, 2011)
Oxxo Catarina (Convenience Store) (opened in December 2011)
Oxxo Portal Arista (Convenience Store) (opened in April 2017)
El Bodegón (Furniture store) (opened on January 17, 2014)
Farmacia Zacoalco (local pharmacy)
Abarrotes Santana (local convenience store) (opened in 2012)
Súper Santa Catarina (local convenience store) (General Andrés Figueroa)
La Súper Tienda (home store) (Initially opened in August 1953, closed in September 2018 and re-opened in April 2019)

Former 
Banamex Zacoalco de Torres (closed on March 23, 2018)

Industry 
 Centro Logístico de Jalisco (Opened in 2015)
 Almería

Government

Municipal presidents

References

Municipalities of Jalisco